MW is a live-action Japanese film released in 2009 and based on the manga of the same name by Osamu Tezuka. The film was directed by Hitoshi Iwamoto. The film was shot in Kantō region for 40 days, and the car chase scene was shot in Bangkok.

Casts
 Hiroshi Tamaki as Michio Yūki
 Takayuki Yamada as Yūtarō Garai
 Yusuke Yamamoto as Satoshi Mizohata
 Rio Yamashita as a girl at a church
 Shingo Tsurumi as Matsuo
 Ryo Ishibashi as Kazuyuki Sawaki
 Yuriko Ishida as Kyōko Makino

References

External links
 
 MW(2009) at allcinema 
 MW at KINENOTE 

2009 films
Live-action films based on manga
Films based on works by Osamu Tezuka
Films scored by Yoshihiro Ike
2000s Japanese films